Žarko Vekić (born May 1, 1967) is a Serbian sprint canoer who competed as an Independent Olympic Participant at the 1992 Summer Olympics in Barcelona. He was eliminated in the repechages of both the K-1 500 m and the K-2 1000 m events.

In the K-1 500 meters, Vekić finished 6th in his heat, and then 6th again in Repechage 1, where only the top 4 advanced to the semifinals.

References
Sports-Reference.com profile

1967 births
Serbian male canoeists
Yugoslav male canoeists
Canoeists at the 1992 Summer Olympics
Living people
Olympic canoeists as Independent Olympic Participants